This is a list of Head Masters of Eton College since 1442.

Note: for explanation of alternative year dates in this list, such as '1494/5', see Old Style and New Style dates.

List

15th century

William Westbury (1442–1447)
Richard Hopton (1447–1453)
Thomas Forster (1453)
Clement Smith (1453–1458)
John Peyntor (1458–1467)
Clement Smyth (1467–1470)
Walter Barber (1470 –  1479)
David Haubroke ( 1479 – 1484)
Thomas Mache (1484–1485/6)
William Horman (1485/6–1494/5)
Edward Powell (1494/5–1496)

16th century

17th century

18th century

19th century

20th century

21st century

See also
 List of Provosts of Eton College
 Master in College

Notes

References

Sources

 

Eton College, Head Masters
Eton College, Head Masters
Head Masters
 
Schoolteachers by school